Shine On: The Ultimate Collection is a digitally remastered two-disc greatest hits compilation album of American singer Laura Branigan. It is the Grammy-nominated vocalist's first multi-disc collection and her first music video compilation.  It was released on June 15, 2010 by Gallo and Warner Music in South Africa and is available as an import in other regions through Branigan's official website. Nearly all the tracks on the first disc are edited versions.

The first disc is an 18-track CD featuring Branigan's biggest hits, including international hit singles "Gloria" and "Self Control" along with rarer songs such as fan-favorite "Forever Young", from the long out-of-print 1985 album Hold Me, and the two recordings recorded for her 1995 collection The Best of Branigan, "Show Me Heaven" and "Dim All the Lights".  Branigan's vocal performance of "Gloria" received a 1982 Grammy Award nomination for Best Pop Vocal, Female.

The second disc is a DVD featuring all except one of Branigan's Atlantic Records music videos, including the 1984 "Self Control" clip helmed by Academy Award-winning director William Friedkin. Branigan was nominated (alongside Tina Turner and Cyndi Lauper) for a 1985 American Music Award as Favorite Pop/Rock Female Video Artist on the basis of that and her other 1984 music video, "The Lucky One".  The only one of Branigan's Atlantic videos not included in the set is the 1988 clip for "Cry Wolf", which was intended for inclusion until Gallo and Warner Music were unable to locate an original source tape.

Track listing

References

2010 greatest hits albums
Laura Branigan albums
Atlantic Records compilation albums
Compilation albums published posthumously